Molon labe, meaning 'come and take [them]', is a classical expression of defiance. 
It is among the Laconic phrases reported by Plutarch, attributed to King Leonidas I in reply to the demand by Xerxes I that the Spartans surrender their weapons. The exchange between Leonidas and Xerxes occurs in writing, on the eve of the Battle of Thermopylae (480 BC).

Grammar 

The phrase  is in the Classical Greek of Plutarch, and does not necessarily reflect the Doric dialect that Leonidas would have used.

The phrase is participial, and the translation would be "when you come, take it!" This use of the participle is known as the circumstantial participle in the grammar of classical Greek, i.e. the participle gives a circumstance (the coming) attendant on the main verb (the taking). It is a form of hypotaxis, where English would use parataxis, the conjunction of two verbs, "come and take". This construction normally (but not always) occurs within narrative literature.

The first word,  ("having come") is the aorist active participle (masculine, nominative, singular) of the Greek verb  ("to come").

The aorist participle is used in cases where an action has been completed, also called the perfective aspect. This is a nuance indicating that the first action (the coming) must precede the second (the taking).

The second word, is the second person singular aorist imperative  of  "take; grasp, seize". The entire phrase is thus in the singular, i.e. Leonidas is depicted as addressing Xerxes personally, not the Persian army as a group.

Origin 
Plutarch cites the phrase in his  ("Sayings of Spartans"). The exchange between Leonidas and Xerxes occurs in writing, on the eve of the Battle of Thermopylae (480 BC):
 
When Xerxes wrote again, 'Hand over your arms,' he wrote in reply, 'Come and take them.' (trans. Frank Cole Babbitt, 1931)

The exchange is cited in a collection of sayings by Leonidas before the Battle of Thermopylae (51.2–15).

The main source for the events of the battle is Herodotus. According to his account, the Spartans held Thermopylae for three days, and although ultimately defeated, they inflicted serious damage on the Persian army. Most importantly, this delayed the Persians' progress to Athens, providing sufficient time for the city's evacuation to the island of Salamis. Though a tactical defeat, Thermopylae served as a strategic and moral victory, inspiring the Greek forces to defeat the Persians at the Battle of Salamis later the same year and the Battle of Plataea one year later.

Modern use

Greece
The motto is on the emblem of the I Army Corps of Greece and the Second Infantry Division of Cyprus (1940).  The phrase was inscribed on the Thermopylae monument (1955), using an archaic script that would be appropriate for the time of the Persian Wars.

During the Cyprus Emergency between Greek Cypriot insurgents and British troops, Cypriot leader Grigoris Afxentiou on 3 March 1957 became surrounded by British forces outside his secret hideout near the Machairas Monastery near Lazanias, Nicosia. The British troops requested that he surrender his arms, but Afxentiou shouted  in reply. Unable to flush him out and sustaining several casualties, the British forces resorted to pouring gasoline into his hideout and lighting it.

United States

Allusion to the phrase in an English translation ("come and take it!") is recorded in the context of the Revolutionary War, noted in 1778 at Fort Morris in the Province of Georgia, and later in 1835 at the Battle of Gonzales during the Texas Revolution where it became a prevalent slogan.

In the United States, the original Greek phrase and its English translation are often heard as a defense of the right to keep and bear arms and opposition to gun control legislation. 

Use of the original Greek in the United States is more recent. Its use by militia organizations is reported for the 1990s or early 2000s. It is the motto of the Special Operations Command Central (SOCCENT).

See also 
 Nuts!
 Russian warship, go fuck yourself
 They shall not pass

Notes

References 

Greek words and phrases
Quotations from military
Slogans
Battle of Thermopylae
American political catchphrases
Leonidas I
Battle cries